Hola  is a village in the administrative district of Gmina Stary Brus, within Włodawa County, Lublin Voivodeship, in eastern Poland.

There is situated Open Air Museum of Material Culture of Chełm Land and Podlasie (Sansen Kultury Materialnej Chełmszczyzny i Podlasia w Holi).

References

Villages in Włodawa County